Agoney Hernández Morales (Adeje, Tenerife, Spain, 18 October 1995), also known as Agoney, is a Spanish singer, composer and performer who rose to fame from his participation on the Operación Triunfo 2017 programme. Due to his great vocal potential and the versatility of his voice—and in reference to his home of the Canary Islands—he has been nicknamed "the Canary with the golden voice".

Early life
Agoney Hernández Morales was born on 18 October 1995 in Adeje, Santa Cruz de Tenerife. At the age of six, he began to play the trumpet in a band, and later continued studying music in Tenerife. He attended a performing arts high school and before entering Operación Triunfo, he worked as a singer at a hotel in Tenerife.

Career

Operación Triunfo 2017

In 2017 Agoney appeared at the casting of Operación Triunfo 2017, a reality talent show that is the original Spanish version of the Star Academy franchise. Agoney was chosen as one of the 16 participants of the talent show. He was eliminated in gala 12 after a very close vote against fellow contestant Ana Guerra who won with 50.3% of the two million votes. Once finished in the contest, Agoney was part of the Spanish Operación Triunfo tour, performing in such notable venues as the Palau Sant Jordi in Barcelona, the Olympic Stadium in La Cartuja in Seville, the Bizkaia Arena in Bilbao, and the Santiago Bernabéu Stadium in Madrid.

2018–2019: After Operación Triunfo
After finishing the tour of Operación Triunfo 2017, Agoney's solo career began. On 31 August 2018 he released his debut single, "Quizás" (Spanish for "maybe"). The song's lyrics are aimed at those who did not believe in him. Musically "Quizás" has been compared to artists such as Mika, Troye Sivan and Adam Lambert. "Quizás" received rave reviews and reached number one on the Spanish iTunes singles chart. The music video for the song reached one million views on YouTube in less than 48 hours. In December 2018 he sang with Ana Guerra, Lola Índigo, Raoul and Aitana for the Coca-Cola advertising campaign for Christmas.

After passing through Operation Triunfo, Agoney has become an icon of the LGBT community. He was one of the opening speakers at LGTBI+ Pride of Madrid 2018.

Agoney appeared at the 2019 Gran Canaria Drag Queen Contest, where he performed a dance remix of his single "Quizás" as part of the interval show.

In March 2019, Agoney competed on the Spanish music television series La mejor canción jamás cantada (The Best Song Ever Sung). He won the 2010s episode with his performance of Pastora Soler's Eurovision 2012 entry "Quédate conmigo" and placed second in the grand final with his performance of David Bisbal's 2001 single "Ave María".

In August 2019, Agoney released his second solo single, "Black". The song was written by Agoney and gives commentary on modern society and the pressures of social media. It was accompanied by a music video directed by Frankie De Leonardis. In November of that year, Agoney made his first musical tour outside of Spain visiting Argentina.

2020-2023: Libertad and Benidorm Fest
In 2020, Agoney released the singles "Libertad", "MÁS" and "Edén", along with his debut album Libertad. The album debuted at No.1 on the Spanish albums chart.

The same year Agoney also released the single "Strangers", a collaboration with the producer Brian Cross and he was part of Rosana Arbelo's charity single "Sin miedo 2020". He sang as part of "Piensa en positivo", the official anthem of Madrid Pride 2020.

In 2021, Agoney released a cover of Erasure's "A Little Respect" as part of the soundtrack of the Spanish film El Cover. He also made a cameo appearance in the film. Later that year, he released the single "¿Quién pide al cielo por ti?", co-written with Alberto Jiménez of the indie-pop group Miss Caffeina.

Agoney was confirmed as one of the competing acts in the ninth series (2021/2022) of the Spanish celebrity impersonation show Tu cara me suena. He went on to win the series after picking up 53% of the vote following his grand final imitation of Dimash Kudaibergen singing "SOS d'un terrien en détresse". Coinciding with the show's grand final, Agoney also released his single "Bangover",  which became Number 1 on iTunes in Spain, Chile and Argentina.

On July 14, 2022, Agoney released a new single titled "Cachito".

On October 26, 2022, his participation in the Benidorm Fest 2023 was announced, an event held to select the representative candidacy of Spain in the Eurovision Song Contest that year. On December 19, Agoney published on his social networks the song "Quiero arder", his entry for the Benidorm Fest 2023, starting as the great favorite of the public. He competed in the first semi-final on January 31, 2023, and placed first with 161 points, winning the expert jury vote and televote, and thus qualifying for the final. Agoney went on to place second in the final overall with a total of 145 points.

Personal life

Agoney is influenced by Queen, Whitney Houston, Rachelle Ferrell and Muse.

He is openly gay, having defended the visibility and rights of the LGBT community during Operación Triunfo and the national tour after it. Agoney was selected as one of the speakers at the opening ceremony of Madrid Pride 2018 and was featured on the cover of the winter 2018/2019 issue of the Spanish LGBT travel magazine Shangay Voyager. He is in a relationship with Spanish dancer Marc Montojo since 2022. They made their relationship public by sharing a kiss after Agoney's victory on Tu cara me suena.

Philanthropy
Agoney is an ambassador of Fundación Canaria Carrera por la Vida (the Canary Islands Walk For Life Foundation), a Canary Islands charity which supports and raises awareness of breast cancer. He appeared as the August photo in the 2019 charity calendar for the organisation.

In November 2019, Agoney joined the TV presenter Emma García and actress Eva Isanta to front a humorous campaign to encourage early HIV testing in Spain. In May 2020, he sang as part of Rosana Arbelo's charity single "Sin miedo 2020", in aid of the Spanish Red Cross. Agoney was also part of the official anthem of Madrid Pride 2020, a cover of Fangoria's "Piensa en positivo". In April 2022, together with other artists from the Spanish national scene, he participated in the benefit concert "Unidos por la paz: Ucrania en el corazón", organized by Radio Televisión Española in order to raise funds for the victims of the Ukrainian War.

Discography

Albums

Singles

As lead artist

Other appearances

Music videos

Awards and nominations

Premios El Suplemento

Actuality Awards

Other awards

Filmography

Film

Television

References

External links

 
 

1995 births
Living people
People from Tenerife
Singers from the Canary Islands
English-language singers from Spain
Gay composers
Gay singers
Spanish LGBT singers
Operación Triunfo contestants
Benidorm Fest contestants
21st-century Spanish male singers
21st-century Spanish LGBT people